May is a district of Pavlodar Region in northern Kazakhstan. The administrative center of the district is the selo of Koktobe. Population:

Geography
May District lies in the Kazakh Uplands. The Irtysh River flows in the northern limit and Alkamergen and Karasor are the largest lakes.

References

Districts of Kazakhstan
Pavlodar Region